The Bombay Gymkhana, established in 1875, is one of the premiere gentlemen clubs in the city of Mumbai, India. Bombay Gymkhana Rugby Club (rugby union) are tenants.

It is located in the Fort area of South Mumbai area and was originally built as a British-only club, designed by English architect, Claude Batley.

The Gymkhana's Grounds offers its members various sporting facilities like rugby, football, cricket, swimming, tennis, badminton, squash and also has a fitness centre. It is located at the triangular end of Azad Maidan and is in close proximity of Chhatrapati Shivaji Maharaj Terminus.

The club regularly conducts sporting events and tournaments for its members and admission to the club is reserved by membership.

Sports
A long building which serves as the lobby, table tennis area, badminton court, restaurant and lounge connects the two roads. The region between the building and the lane is a large ground. It is very difficult to get membership into this exclusive club.

Cricket is played here in the winter months, and rugby and football in the monsoon months. This used to be major centre for the erstwhile Bombay Pentangular cricket matches. The ground had the distinction of hosting India's first Test cricket match on 15 December 1933, captained by CK Nayudu. Temporary stands were put up at the ground to accommodate a record crowd of 50,000 people, with tickets selling at five times their usual price. The match is remembered for Lala Amarnaths century, noted to be one of the best innings played in Indian cricket. It hasn't hosted any senior matches since the Brabourne Stadium took its place in 1937, replacing the ground as the venue for the Bombay Pentangular as well as international matches.

The ground also has the distinction of hosting the first-ever International Test Cricket match played by the disabled on 10 December 2002. This first-ever Test cricket match of disabled was played between India and England. The match was of one day duration and India had won the match.

The Australian cricket team used the grounds to practice prior to their clash with India in the 1996 Cricket World Cup. In 2004, the Indian Women's team played a One Day International versus the Australian Women's team at Bombay Gymkhana. In March 2010, Mumbai Indians played a practice match at the ground ahead of the IPL Season. Later in the year, Canada played a match against a Bombay Gymkhana team to prepare of the World Cup in 2011.

The ground also hosts a national rugby competition, and has recently hosted matches against Sri Lanka and a few other South Asian teams as a part of the HSBC Sevens Asia circuit. It has also hosted national and international squash tournaments.

Bombay Gymkhana houses three badminton courts, five squash courts, six tennis courts, six tables for billiards and snooker, one swimming pool and a fitness centre.

Until a few years ago, only men could gain membership to the club.  Women were able to join from the early 2000s.

Road widening controversy 
The BMC wants to widen the adjacent Hazarimal Somani Marg from 50 to 80 feet and required about 6000 feet of land from the Bombay Gymkhana. The gymkhana has been contesting the proposal stating its heritage status. The Gymkhana has also been allegedly charged for illegally constructing additional buildings including a CEO's bungalow and a wine shop.

International Centuries

Tests

This is the list of centuries scored in Test matches at Bombay Gymkhana, Mumbai

List of Five Wicket Hauls

Tests

Two five wicket hauls in Test matches have been taken at the venue.

See also
List of Test cricket grounds
 One-Test wonder
List of India's gentlemen's clubs

References

External links

 Cricinfo Website - Ground Page
HSBC Bombay Gymkhana Maharashtra State Open Squash Championship 2006 Results
Club website
 cricketarchive Website - Ground Page

Sports venues in Mumbai
Cricket grounds in Maharashtra
Clubs and societies in India
1875 establishments in India
Test cricket grounds in India
Sports venues completed in 1875